The Road Individual Time Trial at the 2003 Pan American Games in Santo Domingo, Dominican Republic was held on the second day of the cycling competition, on 11 August 2003.

Results

Men's Individual Time Trial (50 km)

Women's Individual Time Trial (30 km)

See also
 Cycling at the 2004 Summer Olympics – Men's road time trial
 Cycling at the 2004 Summer Olympics – Women's road time trial

References
cyclingnews

Road Time Trial
2003 in road cycling
Road cycling at the Pan American Games